Nenad Starovlah (Serbian Cyrillic: Ненад Старовлах; Greek: Νέναντ Στάροβλαχ; born 29 July 1955) is a Bosnian professional football manager and former player. He also holds Cypriot citizenship.

Club career
Born in Sarajevo, Starovlah was chosen as the best young player at the tournament of the Republic Championship and was after the tournament called up to the first team of hometown club Željezničar in July 1972. He later on played 137 league games for Željezničar from 1972 till 1982, and as a defender nevertheless scored 18 goals. He was part of the team that played in the 1980–81 Yugoslav Cup final against Velež Mostar which they lost 3–2. He retired from professional football in 1982 at the age of 27 because of a serious knee injury.

International career
Starovlah got a chance to play in two games for the Yugoslav national team, with whom he won the gold medal at the 1979 Mediterranean Games in Split.

Managerial career

Early career
After ending his playing career in 1982, Starovlah took over the U10 side of Željezničar and for eight years he managed the team, winning six republic titles of Bosnia and Herzegovina. Due to the fact that sixteen of these players from that generation signed a professional contract with the first team, Starovlah became an assistant manager of the Željezničar first team in 1991 under Milan Ribar. War in Yugoslavia began in 1992 and as a result the team split. Many of these players  continued their career abroad like Mario Stanić, Elvir Baljić, Marijo Dodik, Boris Vasković, Veldin Karić and others. Starovlah also took over the Yugoslav U16 national team in 1987. The team reached the finals of the 1990 UEFA European Under-16 Championship, losing the final to Czechoslovakia by 3–2. During the same period whilst he was the head coach of the Yugoslav U16 team, Starovlah was also the head coach of the Bosnia and Herzevoina U17 national team.

Hajduk Kula
In 1992, after years of experience in the previous teams managed, Starovlah moved to Serbia and became manager of Hajduk Kula, making great results at the club. 

Radoman Vasović, the club's president at the time, declared:

"Even if prior to deciding to assign Starovlah as our manager, we had information about who and what personality he had, it is not till now that we can say that we are absolutely certain that we received what we wanted: a young and professional manager, a person who is fully dedicated to football, who has energy and ambition to achieve the goal that has been set, and who knows how to teach the players how to play football but also to psychologically motivate them to always give their maximum.”

Borac Čačak
Starovlah then joined Borac Čačak, where the committee of the club considered that he was the ideal manager to help their team achieve their major goal which was to get promotion to the First League of FR Yugoslavia. In 1994, with Starovlah the team achieved their goal after a thirty-two year wait.

Period in Greece and Cypurus
In July 1994, Starovlah signed a 1-year contract with, at the time, Super League Greece club Ethnikos Piraeus. After only four months as the club's manager, Starovlah got sacked after a series of bad results. Then, from 1995 until 1999, he worked at Apollon Limassol in Cyprus. He first was first appointed as the club's academy technical advisor, and later in 1998 became manager.

In 1999, Starovlah signed a contract with another Cypriot club, Enosis Neon Paralimni. In the 1999–2000 season, Enosis finished in 8th place in the league and after the end of the season Starovlah left the club.

Sutjeska Nikšić
Continuing his career, in 2000 Starovlah returned to FR Yugoslavia and became the manager of Sutjeska Nikšić. He stayed there for one year.

Return to Apollon (academy technical director)
After Sutjeska, Starovlah made his return to Apollon. During his time at the club, he was the technical director of the academy. Starovlah managed a number of players who are known to be one of the most successful both in the Cypriot First Division and abroad. On 1 October 2004, the Cypriot newspapers named him “Ο πιο πιστός στρατιώτης,” which in English means “The most dedicated soldier.”

Željezničar
In July 2006, Starovlah became the manager of the club where it all started, Željezničar in the Bosnian Premier League. In September 2006, Starovlah was controversaly sacked, even though at the time the team was in 4th place and had only 5 points less than 1st placed club, fierce city rivals Sarajevo.

Omonia (team manager)
In 2008, Starovlah became the team manager of Cypriot club Omonia. He remained on that position until 2016. During that time, Omonia made big success in both the league and cup, and Starovlah was very much praised for all the success the club made during that time.

Reception
Some players mentioned that Starovlah was their mentor and guided them to their current careers. Zoran Simunović described him as “a high quality manager with many diplomas, who managed to make a lot of success in his career.” Panayiotis Frangeskou named Starovlah to be his “football father,” due to his years of support. Zoran Šaraba stated that “Starovlah is a great expert who is in love with football. He knows how to work, he is ambitious and is a real professional whom everyone loves: players, management and fans." Of course, Starovlah has also been criticized by certain managers and players as well.

Honours

Player
Yugoslavia
Mediterranean Games: 1979

Manager
Borac Čačak
Second League of FR Yugoslavia: 1993–94

References

External links

1955 births
Living people
Footballers from Sarajevo
Yugoslav footballers
Yugoslav First League players
Yugoslav Second League players
FK Željezničar Sarajevo players
Yugoslavia international footballers
Competitors at the 1979 Mediterranean Games
Mediterranean Games gold medalists for Yugoslavia
Mediterranean Games medalists in football
Association football defenders
Yugoslav football managers
Bosnia and Herzegovina football managers
Expatriate football managers in Serbia and Montenegro
Expatriate football managers in Cyprus
Super League Greece managers
Cypriot First Division managers
Premier League of Bosnia and Herzegovina managers
FK Hajduk Kula managers
FK Borac Čačak managers
Ethnikos Piraeus F.C. managers
Apollon Limassol FC managers
Enosis Neon Paralimni FC managers
FK Sutjeska Nikšić managers
FK Željezničar Sarajevo managers